Statistics of Osotspa Saraburi in Asian competition.

AFC Champions League

Results

AFC Cup

Results

References

Asia